Všekary is a municipality and village in Plzeň-South District in the Plzeň Region of the Czech Republic. It has about 100 inhabitants.

History
The first written mention of Všekary is from 1115.

From 1 January 2021, Všekary is no longer a part of Domažlice District and belongs to Plzeň-South District.

Gallery

References

Villages in Plzeň-South District